The women's singles soft tennis event was part of the soft tennis programme and took place between October 5 and 7, at the Sajik Tennis Courts.

Schedule
All times are Korea Standard Time (UTC+09:00)

Results

Preliminary round

Group A

Group B

Group C

Final round

References 

2002 Asian Games Official Reports, Page 695–696
Official website

External links 
Results

Soft tennis at the 2002 Asian Games